The Yearbook for Traditional Music is a peer-reviewed academic journal covering research on folk music and dance. It is published by the International Council for Traditional Music, twice a year. The editor-in-chief is Lonán Ó Briain. The Yearbook was established in 1949 as the Journal of the International Folk Music Council, obtaining its current title in 1981. The journal is abstracted and indexed in the Arts & Humanities Citation Index and Current Contents/Arts & Humanities.

References

External links
 

Dance research
Publications established in 1949
Music journals
Annual journals
English-language journals
Cambridge University Press academic journals